Palacios de Sanabria is a municipality located in the province of Zamora, Castile and León, Spain. According to the 2004 census (INE), the municipality had a population of 322.

Town hall
Palacios de Sanabria is home to the town hall of 4 towns:
Palacios de Sanabria (124 inhabitants, INE 2020).
Vime de Sanabria (65 inhabitants, INE 2020).
Otero de Sanabria (24 inhabitants, INE 2020).
Remesal de Sanabria (17 inhabitants, INE 2020).

References

External links

Portal de Turismo de Sanabria
Anuncios Clasificados en Sanabria

Municipalities of the Province of Zamora